Federico Gastón Carrizo (born 17 May 1991, in Villa Giardino), commonly known as Pachi Carrizo, is an Argentine footballer who plays as midfielder for Cerro Porteño in the Paraguayan Primera División.

Club career
In 2014, Carrizo signed with Argentinian club Boca Juniors. On 10 March 2016, Carrizo scored a goal against Bolivar for the 2016 Copa Libertadores, the match ended 1-1.

On 9 February 2022, it was announced that Carrizo did not want to sign his new Cerro Porteño contract that obliged him to be vaccinated against Covid-19, something that went against the footballer's religion.

Honours
Rosario Central
Copa Argentina: 2017–18

Boca Juniors
Copa Argentina: 2015
Primera División de Argentina: 2015
Primera División de Argentina: 2016-17

References

External links
 

1991 births
Living people
Sportspeople from Córdoba Province, Argentina
Argentine footballers
Association football midfielders
Argentine Primera División players
Primera Nacional players
Liga MX players
Paraguayan Primera División players
Rosario Central footballers
Boca Juniors footballers
Cruz Azul footballers
Cerro Porteño players
Argentine expatriate footballers
Expatriate footballers in Mexico